Skiltron is a folk metal band formed in Buenos Aires in 2004 by Emilio Souto. Since 2018, the band has moved to Europe (Finland, Spain and France). Skiltron are considered one of the few Southern American metal bands to fuse heavy metal and Celtic music, a style usually more common in many parts of Europe. They are also well known for incorporating bagpipes into their music. The name "Skiltron" derives from a variation of the word schiltron, a formation used by the Scottish during the Wars of Independence.

Starting with a 3 song demo in 2004 called Gathering the Clans, the band released their full length debut album The Clans Have United in 2006 through the European Record label Underground Symphony. This was followed by their second album Beheading the Liars in 2008, and their third album in 2010, The Highland Way, with each album continually building on the band's unique style and sound. Their most recent album is Legacy of Blood, released in 2016, released by Trollzorn Records.

Most of their early live concerts took place in Argentina, sharing the stage with bands such as Grave Digger, In Extremo and Korpiklaani, with whom the band shared a South American tour in 2010. They made their debut playing in Europe in the UK in 2012, where they were joined by Sabbat and Skyclad singer Martin Walkyier as a guest.

After the release of fourth album Into the Battleground in 2013 the band started to tour Europe regularly, playing festivals such as Wacken, Bloodstock and more. They were thus able to share the stage with bands such as Judas Priest, Slayer, In Flames, King Diamond, Avantasia, and more. The release of their latest album in 2016 was followed by a European tour, where they played 50 shows in two months in twenty countries. They toured the UK alongside pirate metal band Iron Seawolf. In early 2017 they played for the first time in Japan, sharing three shows with German bands Equilibrium and Suidakra.

Members

Current members 
 Emilio Souto − electric guitar, mandolin, bouzouki (2004-present)
 Ignacio López - bass (2011-present)
 Pereg Ar Bagol - bagpipes (2014-present)
 Joona Nislin - drums (2018-present)
 Paolo Ribaldini - vocals (2021-present)

Former members
 Martin McManus - vocals (2015-2021)
 Matias Pena − drums (2004-2018)
 Juan José Fornés − electric guitar (2006-2011)
 Fernando Marty − bass (2004-2011)
 Diego Valdez − vocals (2006-2011)
 Pablo Allen − bagpipes (2006-2011), tin whistle (2008-2011)
 Diego Spinelli - tin whistle, irish flute, piccolo (2006-2008)
 Esteban D'antona - viola (2006-2007)

Discography

Demos

Albums

References

External links

 Official Website
 Official Facebook

Argentine folk metal musical groups
Musical groups established in 2004
Celtic metal musical groups